William Aaron Moore (19 April 1916 – 24 April 2000) was an English character actor. He was best known for his role as long-suffering Sydney Lumsden in the popular 1980s comedy series Sorry! (in which he became known for the catchphrase "Language, Timothy!"). He also appeared in numerous other television programmes, including Coronation Street as Cyril Turpin, Betty Turpin’s husband from 1969–1970. The character put in two more appearances in 1972, then died off-screen in 1974.
Moore was married to actress Mollie Sugden from 29 March 1958 until his death. Their twin sons, Robin and Simon, were born in October 1963. Moore starred with Sugden in My Husband and I.

Moore died on 24 April 2000 in London, five days after his 84th birthday.

Television roles

Selected filmography
 At the Stroke of Nine (1957)
Black Jack (1979)

References

External links

1916 births
2000 deaths
English male television actors
Male actors from Birmingham, West Midlands
20th-century English male actors